Sampson E. Whipple (September 25, 1960 – June 3, 2002) was an American actor best remembered for his role as Dr. John Ballard on the TV series Seven Days.

His credits include The Doors, Airheads, This Is Spinal Tap and The Rock. He also appeared in television shows such as Open All Night, The Larry Sanders Show, Seinfeld, and Home Improvement.

On June 3, 2002, Whipple died at age 41 after a two-year battle with cancer.

Filmography

References

External links

1960 births
2002 deaths
American male film actors
American male television actors
Deaths from cancer in California
Male actors from Los Angeles
20th-century American male actors
People from Venice, Los Angeles